Blastobasis inana is a moth of the family Blastobasidae. It was first described by Arthur Gardiner Butler in 1881 from Hawaii, but it is a widely dispersed species whose distribution includes India, New Britain and French Polynesia.

It is an obscure, rather mouse-colored species with two small black spots along the middle line of each forewing. The scaling on the anterior part of the thorax is darker, almost black, and contrasts with the mostly pale, tan or cream-colored, scaling of the head. The scales on the front of the head are large and broad and lie smoothly forward.

Larvae have been recorded feeding on garden beans, coffee berries, dead sugarcane and Dioscorea species.

External links

Blastobasis